Fire Station No. 23 is a former fire station in Downtown Los Angeles.  Built in 1910 as an operating fire station, it was also the Los Angeles Fire Department's headquarters until 1920 and the residence of every fire chief from 1910-1928.  When it opened, it spawned a political firestorm due to the ornate interior and expensive imported materials, leading to its being called the "Taj Mahal" of firehouses.  After 50 years of operation, the station was closed in 1960 as the department began replacing older stations with new facilities.  Since the 1980s, Fire Station No. 23 has been a popular filming location.  Motion pictures filmed at the station include the Ghostbusters movies, The Mask, Police Academy 2, Flatliners, Firehouse and National Security.

History

Construction controversy
In June 1909, the city of Los Angeles announced plans to build a three-story fire station in the heart of the wholesale and manufacturing district that would also serve as the fire department's headquarters.  The projected cost of the station was placed at $35,000.

When the station opened in September 1910 at a final cost of $53,000, a controversy arose over the cost and use of expensive materials, including Peruvian mahogany in the chief's living quarters.  It was considered the "most elaborate and richest engine-house west of New York" and maybe the "most ornate ... in this or any other world."  The Los Angeles Times reported on its opulence as follows:"It is the interior which is to reincarnate man and beast in the fire department.  It is the interior which is a sort of Nirvana for a soulful legion of blue-shirted civil service graduates.  Its spell will be hypnotic, for if the visitor starts in with the third floor he will leave by Winston Street in stupefaction."
More than anything else, it was the extravagant third floor living quarters, described as "the chief's boudoir" and a "palace for chiefs," that drew the most attention. Access to the third floor was by a private elevator that "moves noiselessly and stealthily to the upper haven." The third floor was covered in Peruvian mahogany with French bevel glass mirrors, a mantel of Vermont marble, polished inlaid oak floors, a private slide pole, a massive brass bed, private roof garden, and "a tub big enough for two chiefs." The Times reported: "Notice the Peruvian mahogany carefully, and you will see that the heart of the log has been chosen and that its grain has been placed so that it gives the appearance of real flames. Certainly the esthetic for the reception room of the engine-house de luxe." The chief's apartment alone was reported to have cost $25,000. The Times noted that the quarters rivaled the finest suites in the country, referred to it as a "Sybaritic effort," and offered its sarcastic speculation that the house captain would be expected to "wear evening dress after 6 o'clock, at least."

The unveiling of the ornate fire station set off "a political and civic storm."  It was called a waste of taxpayer funds, as critics contended "three station houses could be built for what this cost."  Amid the outcry, city fire commissioners denied knowledge that the fire house was to have been so luxurious, though newspapers reported that the commissioners had approved the plans.

Operation
Fire Station No. 23 remained an active firehouse from 1910 to 1960.  When it opened, it was staffed by fifteen firefighters and ten horses.  The original equipment included a horse wagon, chief's buggy, and a pumper that used a vertical tube boiler.  The company's first major call was a fire in the old Byrne Building that took ten hours to extinguish.

The station also served as the department's headquarters from 1910–1920, and the home for every fire chief from 1910 to 1928, including chief Ralph J. Scott.  Chief Scott's wife, Addie Scott, lived with him on the third floor and later recalled the station's early days: "I remember the horses.  They really knew what to do.  When the bell would ring, they would come out and stand there to be hitched up. ... It was a nice life here for us. ... I remember trying to wax all these floors, and I just couldn't do it.  So someone came and helped me.  This is a lot of floor space you know."

Fire Station No. 23 was closed in November 1960 as the Los Angeles Fire Department began replacing older stations with newer stations with modern facilities.  At the time of its closure, some of the 1,100 men who had worked there attended a ceremony as the building was "mustered out of service."

Museum

Historic status
In 1966, the station was declared a Historic Cultural Monument by the Los Angeles Cultural Heritage Commission; at the time of the declaration the Los Angeles Times called it the "Taj Mahal of fire stations."  A Library of Congress survey of 250 firehouses concluded that Station 23's interior was "unmatched in its beauty."  It was added to the National Register of Historic Places in 1980.

Controversy over restoration and mismanagement 

Through the 1960s and 1970s, the station deteriorated.  The surrounding neighborhood became part of the city's Skid Row and the station became "a hangout for the street people."  Looters stole most of the copper tubing and brasswork, banisters, doorknobs, firebells, and even the five brass firepoles.

By the mid-1970s, concerns were raised that the building had become a hazard, and some proposed tearing it down.  However, in 1979, the Fire Commission announced plans to restore the rooms back to their 1910 condition and turn the station into a museum.  The City Council placed the station under control of the fire department, but provided that no city funds were to be used in creating the museum.

In 1981, officials of the fire department set up a nonprofit organization called Olde 23 to raise funds to build the museum, but sufficient funds were never raised.  The projected cost of the museum, even in 1982, was $1 million, and critics questioned the wisdom of building a museum in Skid Row.  In 1988, the city settled on a different location for the Los Angeles Fire Department Museum—Engine Co. No. 27 in Hollywood.

Fire Station No. 23 became the subject of controversy again in 1995 when the Los Angeles Times ran a 2,200-word, front-page article reporting on alleged misuse of city funds by Olde 23, the nonprofit charged with restoration of the station.  Even though plans for the fire department museum had shifted to another location years earlier, Olde 23 continued to live on, banking more than $200,000 in fees from film and television producers using the station house as a shooting location.  The Times reported that ex-Chief Donald O. Manning had not told other city agencies about Olde 23's continued operations, and Olde 23 had failed to turn over the income, as required by city law. Investigations by the Times and the City Controller also revealed that some filming fees had been paid in cash to James Croak, an American artist who leased the building from the City of Los Angeles from 1978–85, but no illegality was found as Mr. Croak had the right to sub-lease the property for short periods as long as he notified the landlord that he was doing so. Notably Mr. Croak used most of the money to replace missing brass fire poles, balustrades and other period fixtures that were missing.  Other fees were not accounted for, and Olde 23 the museum non-profit had even collected fees for use of other city fire stations as shooting locations.  Also, even after the city chose a new location for a fire department museum, the chief did not use the funds collected by "Olde 23" for the museum. The controversy came to light after an angry official for Warner Bros. wrote a memorandum complaining about "donations" to the Fire Department and referring to such donations as "extortion."

After artist James Croak vacated Fire Station No. 23, a new “caretaker” named Daniel Taylor went on to live there for another twenty years. Taylor also solicited donations for filming at the Fire Station which he put into his own nonprofit called Corporation for History, Art and Culture. On occasion, Taylor made the Fire Station available to neighborhood groups and sought to turn the space into a community center. Ultimately, Taylor was evicted by the City Attorney when it was found out that proper insurance was not in place.

Filming location
Since 1978 when James Croak occupied the building after an 18-year vacancy, Fire Station No. 23 became a popular filming location for motion pictures, television productions, commercials, and music videos.  In 1995, the Los Angeles Times wrote: "With its finely restored interior and turn-of-the-century architecture, old Fire Station 23 in Downtown Los Angeles is one of the choicest filming locations in town."  One producer called it "a great raw architectural space that you can do a lot with."

The first major motion picture filmed at Station 23 was Hammett (1982) by German director Wim Wenders, followed two years later by Ghostbusters.  The station was used in the 1984 production as the location for the interior scenes of the headquarters of Drs. Venkman, Stantz and Spengler and Winston Zeddemore, as well as their secretary Janine Melnitz. Another station in New York, the Hook & Ladder Company 8 firehouse, was used for the exterior shots. The success of Ghostbusters helped popularize the station as a shooting location, and Fire Station No. 23 has since then been used in more than 50 productions, including Big Trouble in Little China (1986), Ghostbusters II (1989), The Mask (1994), Police Academy 2 (1985), A-Team (1986) and V.I. Warshawski (1991), Flatliners (1990), Lost Highway (1997), National Security (2003), RE(e)volution (2005). and Ghostbusters: Afterlife (2021).

Possible future and more controversy
In 1996, Los Angeles voters approved Proposition K, which was designed to fund the acquisition, improvement, construction and maintenance of city parks, recreation facilities and other youth-oriented spaces. The Prop. K language on the ballot included Fire Station No. 23's transition into a youth arts center. Prop. K is set to sunset in 2026. As of January 2023, Fire Station No. 23 is still in a state of disrepair and has never been open to the public as was intended under the Referendum. In fact, many in the surrounding community question whether a youth arts center is even an appropriate use for the building given the demographic shift since 1996 and several other factors.

As part of Prop. K, Local Volunteer Neighborhood Oversight Committees or “LVNOCs" are created by the city for each proposed project. Fire Station No. 23 has an LVNOC who last met on Nov. 28, 2018. The meeting minutes are posted on the Bureau of Engineering's portal. Several concerns by the LVNOC were raised including lack of a budget to analyze as well as a desire to see adult, in addition to youth programming.

Architectural firm Brooks + Scarpa has been hired by the city to design the interior of the Fire Station, although it is unclear if the project will be complete before Prop. K sunsets. Architectural renderings were shared of what the space could look like as an arts center.

External links
 Fire Station 23 at the Los Angeles Fire Department Historical Archive

See also

List of Registered Historic Places in Los Angeles
Los Angeles Fire Department
Los Angeles Fire Department Museum and Memorial

References

 

Fire stations on the National Register of Historic Places in Los Angeles
Buildings and structures in Downtown Los Angeles
Defunct fire stations in California
Los Angeles Historic-Cultural Monuments
Fire stations completed in 1910
1910 establishments in California
1910s architecture in the United States